The Siegfried Unseld Preis is an international award for scientific and literary accomplishments. It has been awarded biennially on 28 September since its establishment on that date in 2004, the 80th birthday of the German publisher  by the Siegfried Unseld Stiftung ("foundation") and has been endowed with an award sum of €50,000.

Laureates 
 2004: Peter Handke
 2006: Inger Christensen
 2008: Bruno Latour
 2010: Sari Nusseibeh and Amos Oz
 2012: Art Spiegelman

Winners per country

References

External links
Hinweis zum Preis in der Verlagsgeschichte (2004) 

German literary awards
International literary awards